Doritos Crash Course (formerly titled as Avatar Crash Course) is a 3D sidescrolling platforming advergame developed by Wanako Games for the Xbox 360. It was released for free as one of the finalists of the "Unlock Xbox" competition sponsored by Doritos, alongside Harms Way. The concept for the game was designed by Jill Robertson from Raleigh, North Carolina, inspired by Japanese game shows such as Sasuke. On December 29, 2010, the game was announced the winner of the second "Unlock Xbox" competition. The game received positive reviews from critics.

A Windows 8 version of the game, Doritos Crash Course Go!, has since been released.

Gameplay
In Doritos Crash Course, the players have to get their Xbox 360 avatars through increasingly difficult obstacle courses before the time runs out. Each course has a various number of checkpoints scattered throughout. If the avatar falls off the course, the game will begin from the last passed checkpoint. The game is composed of three locations (Europe, Japan, and the United States), each having five levels. Some of the obstacles include collapsing floors, swinging ropes, chains, and water balloons.

Reception

As of year-end 2010, Doritos Crash Course has been downloaded over 1.4 million times. It has received an aggregated review score of 74 on Metacritic, based on five reviews.

Downloadable content
On January 2, 2013, the "City Lights" DLC was made available for $1.99 (USD). The pack contains fifteen levels spanning Las Vegas and London, along with the new versions of the levels set in Japan from the original game.

Sequel
On May 8, 2013, the sequel named Doritos Crash Course 2 was released for free on Xbox Live Arcade. Similar to the first game, avatars controlled by the players will participate in obstacle courses. Leaderboards allow competitions with friends online, where up to four players can in local multiplayer. The game brings our 4 new worlds (Amazon, Antarctic, Egypt, and Pirate Island) with five courses each. Unlike in Doritos Crash Course, players must collect stars, which are used to unlock levels, buy power-ups and effects that change avatars' appearance in-game.

On April 24, 2014, the game was removed from Xbox Live Arcade following an announcement of closure one week prior, on April 17.

See also
 Dash of Destruction
 Harms Way (video game)

References

External links
 
Xbox game details page
Speedrunning Leaderboard

2010 video games
Advergames
Freeware games
Frito-Lay
Microsoft games
Platform games
Video games developed in Canada
Video games with 2.5D graphics
Windows games
Xbox 360 Live Arcade games
Xbox 360 games
Video games about food and drink
Video games developed in Chile
Video games scored by Rod Abernethy
Behaviour Interactive games